The 2017–18 Greek A1 Ethniki will be the 36th season of the A1 Ethniki, Greece's premier handball women's league.

Teams

A total of 10 teams will participate in this year's edition of the Women's A1 Ethniki. Of these, 8 sides qualified directly from the 2016–17 season, while 2 sides qualified from the A2 Ethniki play-offs: GAS Kamatero and Aris Thessaloniki.

Regular season

League table

Results

Finals 
In the finals, teams playing against each other have to win three games to win the series. Thus, if one team wins three games before all five games have been played, the remaining games are omitted. The team that finished in the higher championship play-off place, is going to play the first, second and fifth (if necessary) game of the series at home.

Source: Hellenic Handball Federation

References

External links
Official website 

Handball in Greece
2017–18 domestic handball leagues
2017 in Greek women's sport
2018 in Greek women's sport